Lawrence Nicholas "Larry" Guarino (April 16, 1922 – August 18, 2014) was a U.S. Air Force officer, and veteran of three wars. Shot down on his 50th combat mission, he spent more than 8 years as a prisoner of war (POW) during the Vietnam War and earned the Air Force Cross.

As a POW at Hỏa Lò Prison (the "Hanoi Hilton"), he shared a cell with John McCain, the future senior United States senator from Arizona and Republican nominee for president in the 2008 United States election.

Guarino wrote A P.O.W.'s Story: 2801 Days in Hanoi about his experiences in captivity.

He flew the Supermarine Spitfire in World War II.

His last duty station was Patrick Air Force Base and he retired to Satellite Beach and Indian Harbour Beach, Florida, after leaving the Air Force. He died on August 18, 2014.

Awards and decorations
Lawrence Guarino's ribbons as they appeared at retirement.

  Command Pilot Badge

Air Force Cross citation
Colonel Lawrence Nicholas Guarino
U.S. Air Force
Date Of Action: May 11, 1968 – September 22, 1969

The President of the United States of America, authorized by Section 8742, Title 10, United States Code, awards the Air Force Cross to Colonel Lawrence N. Guarino for extraordinary heroism in military operations against an opposing armed force as senior ranking officer of a North Vietnamese prison camp during the period 11 May 1968 to 22 September 1969. Following the execution of a carefully conceived escape plan by two of his officers, Colonel Guarino, who was known by the enemy to be the senior ranking officer in the camp, immediately came under maximum pressure including savage torture without parallel. Colonel Guarino exhibited exceptional heroism, courage, and determination during this period. Displaying great resilience when back in communication, he assumed command once again and slowly built the prisoner organization. Through his extraordinary heroism and maximum resistance in the face of a brutal enemy, he reflected the highest credit upon himself and the United States Air Force.

See also
When Hell was in Session

References

1922 births
2014 deaths
United States Army Air Forces personnel of World War II
United States Air Force personnel of the Korean War
United States Air Force personnel of the Vietnam War
People from Satellite Beach, Florida
Recipients of the Air Force Cross (United States)
Recipients of the Air Force Distinguished Service Medal
Recipients of the Silver Star
United States Air Force colonels
Vietnam War prisoners of war
People from Indian Harbour Beach, Florida